Ching-Yun Hu is a Taiwanese born classical pianist, winner of the 2008 Arthur Rubinstein International Piano Competition, Founder and Artistic Director Yun-Hsiang International Music Festival in Taipei and Winner of the 2012 Golden Melody Award for Best Classical Album.

Early life
Hu was born in Taipei. She made her concerto debut at the age of 13 with the Poland Capella Cracoviensis Chamber Orchestra.  At the age of 14 she moved to the United States to study at the Juilliard School Pre-College Division.  She would go on to earn her Bachelor's and master's degrees from the Juilliard School, studying with Herbert Stessin and Oxana Yablonskaya. She later studied with Sergei Babayan at the Cleveland Institute of Music, and with Karl-Heinz Kämmerling at the Hochschule für Musik, Theater und Medien Hannover, Germany.  In 1998, Hu won the Silver Medal at the Taipei International Piano Competition.

Career
In 1996, Ching-Yun Hu moved United States to attend The Juilliard School's Pre-College Division. She attended the Aspen Music Festival in the following year and won the Aspen Concerto Competition, performing the Prokofiev Concerto No. 3 with the Aspen Concert Orchestra. The same season, she won the Philadelphia Orchestra Greenfield Competition, which resulted in her debut with the Philadelphia Orchestra, where she performed the Grieg Piano Concerto in a sold concert. She debuted in Europe in 1999 at the Chopin International Music Festival in Duszniki-Zdrój, Poland and gave a recital at the Kleine Zaal of Concertgebouw in Amsterdam in 2000. She made her recital debut at Alice Tully Hall in Lincoln Center in 2007, and subsequently returned in 2009.

In 2008, Ching-Yun Hu won the top prize of the 12th Rubinstein International Piano Master Competition in Tel Aviv, playing with the Israel Philharmonic Orchestra in the Semi-Final and Final. She was also awarded the Audience Favorite Prize. A week after the completion of the competition, she stepped in for Helene Grimaud in Beethoven Concerto No. 1 with the Israel Philharmonic Orchestra, In the two seasons after winning the Rubinstein Competition, she debuted at the Wigmore Hall in London, Klavier-Ruhr Festival, Herkulesaal in Munich, Tel Aviv Opera House, Salle Cortet in Paris, Rubinstein Hall in Lódz Poland, and at the Great Hall of Liszt Academy in Budapest, an invitation from conductor and pianist Tamas Vasary. She was a soloist with the Israel Symphony Orchestra, Johannesburg Philharmonic Orchestra, National Symphony Orchestra of Taiwan.

Following the Rubinstein Competition, Ching-Yun Hu won the 2009 Concert Artists Guild International Competition in New York, and signed a contract under CAG Artist Management. In the following seasons, she performed in many prestigious concert series in the United States and abroad, including her debut at Carnegie Hall's Weill's Recital Hall, her orchestra debut in Sao Paulo, across Europe at Bridgewater Hall in Manchester, UK and Munich's Gasteig, and gave a ten-concert tour of South Africa.

Throughout her career, Hu has been supported by the Puffin Foundation in United States, Chi-Mei Foundation in Taiwan, Solti Foundation in Belgium, Hattori Foundation in London, and the Education and Cultural Committees in Taiwan.

Golden Melody Awards
Ching-Yun Hu released her debut album "Ching-Yun Hu plays Chopin" under Taiwanese label ArchiMusic in April, 2011. The album was nominated for two Golden Melodies in 2012 for "Best Performance" and "Best Classical Album of the Year.  It won the Golden Melody "Best Classical Album of the Year."

Yun-Hsiang International Music Festival
Enthusiastic in promoting Taiwanese musicians, music and helping young artists from her country, in 2011, Ching-Yun Hu founded the Yun-Hsiang Foundation and Yun-Hsiang International Music Festival in 2011. The first festival will be held in Taipei in November, 2012.

The Festival hosts 16 masterclasses by the festival artists, the Yun-Hsiang Concerto Competition, four concerts of solo and concerto programs at the National Theater and Concert Hall, Taipei. The festival's goal is to promote classical music in Taiwan and help bridge a connection between world-class musicians to young talents in Taiwan, by giving young artists opportunities to study and perform alongside great masters.

The artist roster of the 2012 Festival includes pianist Sergei Babayan, violinists Grzegorz Kotow, Daniel Shien-Ta Su, cellists Adrian Brendel, Ouyang YiLing, conductor James P. Liu of the Wuhan Philharmonic Orchestra, and the Evergreen Symphony Orchestra, in addition to performances by Hu.

Awards and recognitions
 1998 Silver Medal & Most Potential Pianist Award - Taipei International Piano Competition
 1999 Silver Medal - Chopin International Piano Competition of Taipei
 1999 Young Artist Award - Chi-Mei Music & Art Foundation, Taiwan
 2001 Rising Star Award - National Cultural Committee & Chiang Kai-Shek Concert Halls, Taiwan
 2001 1st Prize - Puigcerda International Piano Competition, Spain
 2003 Gold Medal and 1st Prize - California International Piano Competition, California
 2005 1st Prize - Seiler International Piano Competition - Artist Division, New York
 2006 1st Prize - Olga Koussetvitsky International Piano Competition, New York
 2007 Gold Medal & First Prize - World Piano Competition, Ohio
 2008 Silver Medal & Audience Favorite Prize (no first prize awarded) - Rubinstein International Piano Master Competition, Israel
 2008 Honorary Award - Taiwan National Cultural Ministry, Taiwan
 2009 Winner - Concert Artists Guild International Competition, New York
 2012 Golden Melody - Best Classical Album, Taiwan

Discography

Ching-Yun Hu Plays Chopin is Hu's debut CD, released in April 2011, was nominated for two Golden Melody Awards for "Best Performance" and "Best Classical Album of the Year."  It won the Golden Melody for "Best Classical Album of the Year."

References

External links
Ching-Yun's Homepage
Jingo.com.tw
 Official website at the Government Information Office
  Official website at the Government Information Office
  Jingo.com.tw
 http://www.yamaha.com/artists/chingyunhu.html
 https://archive.today/20130415203826/http://www.sfcv.org/event/four-seasons-arts/ching-yun-hu-pianist
 http://notesfrommiddleengland.blogspot.com/2010/03/playing-to-horde-ching-yun-hu-at-museum.html
 https://web.archive.org/web/20110301071753/http://concertartists.org/ching-yun-hu_press.htm
 http://articles.philly.com/2012-01-10/news/30612158_1_piano-recital-scriabin-piano-sonata
 http://news.artsmart.co.za/2011/03/fom-ching-yun-hu.html
 http://www.wqxr.org/#!/articles/wqxr-features/2011/nov/21/beethoven-sonata-marathon-reaches-thousands-listeners/slideshow/
 http://www.iol.co.za/tonight/music/sketches-in-sound-delight-the-ear-1.1039946#.UCZkiaOtySo
  

Living people
Year of birth missing (living people)
Aspen Music Festival and School alumni
Musicians from Taipei
Taiwanese expatriates in the United States
Taiwanese classical pianists
Juilliard School alumni
Women classical pianists